The Macau Portuguese School (EPM) is a private, non-profit Portuguese international school located in Macau, China. It serves grades 1–12, and is located in Sé (Cathedral Parish). The school received funding from the Portuguese government.

History

The school opened on August 21, 1998, taking students from Escola Primária Oficial, Escola Comercial Pedro Nolasco, and Liceu de Macau. The former Liceu was a public institution, and the new EPM, a private school, was its continuation. It occupies the former Escola Comercial; circa 1998 this campus, smaller and less expensive to maintain than the former Liceu de Macau, only had enough space to house fewer than half of the students who wished to attend. Initially the school had over 1,100 students. Its administrators were scheduled to be from the local Macanese community, replacing the previous Portuguese leadership at the former Liceu.

Since its establishment the number of students had declined. Around 2012 this reversed and the student body count began to increase.  the school has 577 students from 24 countries; around that period the number of students without a Portuguese background had increased.

Curriculum
The medium of instruction of most classes is Portuguese.

In 2018 Valeria Koob, the president of the school's parent association, advocated for having outside-of-class expeditions for Mandarin Chinese classes.

See also
 Education in Macau

References

External links

 Official web site 

Educational institutions established in 1998
International schools in Macau
1998 establishments in Macau
Macau